Leonard Wailes Covington (October 30, 1768 – November 14, 1813) was a United States Army brigadier general and a member of the United States House of Representatives.

Biography
Born in Aquasco, Prince George's County, in what was then the British Province of Maryland, Leonard Covington joined the United States Army as a Cornet in March 1792. He was promoted to Captain in 1794 and served in the Northwest Indian War (1785–1795) under Anthony Wayne, where he distinguished himself at Fort Recovery and the Battle of Fallen Timbers. He resigned from the military at the conclusion of the Northwest Indian War.

In 1809, Leonard Covington returned to the Army as colonel of light dragoons, having served many years in the Maryland House of Delegates and in 1805–1807  as a Representative (Democratic-Republican Party) in the Ninth Congress. He was in command at Fort Adams on the lower Mississippi River and participated in the December 1810 takeover by the United States of the Republic of West Florida, in today's Florida Parishes, Louisiana.  He served in the War of 1812, being promoted to brigadier general in August 1813. Covington was mortally wounded in the Battle of Crysler's Farm and died three days later at French Mills, Franklin County, New York.

At the time of his death, Brig. Gen. Covington and his family were residents of Washington, the capital of the Mississippi Territory, in a home named Propinquity. It was built in 1810 near the military installation Fort Washington (originally Fort Dearborn), where Covington commanded the Regiment of Light Dragoons. Mrs. Leonard Covington was the former Rebecca Mackall, his first cousin and a relative of the family of General James Wilkinson. The Covingtons had at least four children.

Places named after Covington
 Covington, Georgia
 Covington, Kentucky
 Covington, Louisiana 
 Port Covington, Maryland
 Covington, New York
 Covington, Ohio
 Covington, Pennsylvania
 Covington, Tennessee
 Covington County, Alabama
 Covington County, Mississippi
 Fort Covington, New York
 Covington, Virginia
 Covington Theological Seminary in Rossville, Georgia.

References

External links

COVINGTON, Leonard in the Dictionary of Louisiana Biography  (Scroll down.)

"Presenting General Leonard Wailes Covington" photos of statue in Covington, Kentucky, on a news blog, December 2011.

1768 births
1813 deaths
United States Army generals
American military personnel killed in the War of 1812
Democratic-Republican Party members of the United States House of Representatives from Maryland
People from Prince George's County, Maryland
People from Washington, Mississippi